John Evert Visser (April 24, 1920 – June 8, 1997) was an American education administrator, mostly known for serving as the twelfth president of Emporia State University in Emporia, Kansas. Before serving as president of Emporia State, Visser was an assistant to the president at Ball State University, and held several administrative jobs in higher education. After serving as president of Emporia State, Visser served as several interim titles across the United States.

Early life and education
Visser was born in Orange City, Iowa on April 24, 1920. After high school, Visser received three different degrees from two universities: his bachelor of arts from Hope College in 1943, and in 1947, his master of arts and doctorate degrees from The University of Iowa. Visser joined served in World War II from 1944 to 1946.

Career

Early career
After completing college, Visser began his 40-plus year career as an assistant professor in history at his alma mater in 1949. From 1949 to 1957, Visser also served as the Dean of Men from 1955 to 1956 at Hope College. After that, Visser held several administrative jobs in higher education at a couple of Michigan universities. After working at both WMU and GRJC, Visser was the Ball State University president's executive assistant from 1962 until January 1967.

Kansas State Teachers College
Visser began his tenure as KSTC's twelfth president on the February 15, 1967. Because Visser was very student-oriented, the university senates were established. The most notable accomplishment Visser is known for during his time at KSTC is organizing the school into different academic schools with departments. Some other significant changes during Visser's tenure was the Teachers College hit an all-time enrollment of 7,150 in 1969, and when KSTC changed its name to Emporia Kansas State College in July 1974 and then to its current name, Emporia State University in April 1977, when the school was granted university status. Visser retired on June 30, 1984 with Robert E. Glennen succeeding him.

After Emporia State
After serving as president of Emporia State, Visser took a year off and served as an advisor for the University of Alaska system in 1984 and 1985. After being in Alaska for two years, Visser served as the acting vice-chancellor at the University of Wisconsin–Green Bay and the University of Alaska Southeast's acting chancellor.

References

1920 births
1997 deaths
Ball State University faculty
Emporia State University faculty
Hope College alumni
Hope College faculty
Presidents of Emporia State University
University of Alaska Southeast faculty
University of Iowa alumni
University of Wisconsin–Green Bay faculty
Western Michigan University faculty
20th-century American academics